Carss Park is a suburb in southern Sydney, in the state of New South Wales, Australia 17 kilometres south of the Sydney central business district in the local government area of the Georges River Council. Carss Park is part of the St George area.

History
In 1921 the Blakehurst Progress Association made attempts to secure Carss Bush for a public park and Kogarah council was able to acquire the land for the people. Carss Bush Park was dedicated on 26 January 1924 and 150 lots were auctioned on the same day for development. Many of the streets on the new estate were named after Aboriginal tribes.

Heritage listings 
Carss Park has a number of heritage-listed sites, including:
 74 Carwar Avenue: Carss Cottage

Population

Demographics
According to the 2016 census of Population, there were 1,252 people usually resident in Carss Park. 69.5% of people were born in Australia.  61.2% of people spoke only English at home. Other languages spoken at home included Greek at 12.3%. The most common responses for religious affiliation were Catholic 23.9%, Orthodox 19.9%, No Religion 16.5% and Anglican 14.6%.

Pop culture
 The family home in popular television series Packed to the Rafters is supposed to be located in Carss Park, although the actual location is in Concord. Filming does, however, take place on location in Carss Park and surrounding suburbs.

Gallery

References

External links
  [CC-By-SA]

Suburbs of Sydney
Georges River Council